Luigi Lunari (January 3, 1934 – August 15, 2019) was an Italian playwright.

References

1934 births
2019 deaths
Italian dramatists and playwrights